General Donahue may refer to:

Christopher T. Donahue (born 1969), U.S. Army major general
Patrick J. Donahue II (born 1957), U.S. Army lieutenant general
William J. Donahue (fl. 1960s–2000s), U.S. Air Force lieutenant general

See also
Patrick J. Donahoe (fl. 1980s–2020s), U.S. Army major general
David O'Donahue, Wisconsin National Guard brigadier general